Natalie Rachel Dreyfuss (born February 25, 1987) is an American actress, who has had guest-starring roles on shows such as Burn Notice and The Shield. She also had a recurring role on the television series Rita Rocks, The Secret Life of the American Teenager, and The Flash.

Early life
Dreyfuss is the daughter of Kathy Kann, who works in Hollywood in wardrobe, and actor Lorin Dreyfuss, as well as the niece of actor Richard Dreyfuss and the cousin of actor Ben Dreyfuss. Her father's family is Jewish.

Filmography

References

External links
 

20th-century American actresses
21st-century American actresses
American child actresses
American film actresses
American television actresses
Living people
Place of birth missing (living people)
American people of Jewish descent
American Ashkenazi Jews
1987 births